Lindsay Rogers (May 23, 1891 – 1970) was an American scholar who was Burgess professor emeritus of public law at Columbia University.

Early life and career
Rogers was born In Baltimore on 23 May 1891. He studied at Baltimore City College and Johns Hopkins University, where he completed a PhD in 1915.

In 1920, he joined the law faculty of Columbia University. He taught there until 1959 and held Burgess professor emeritus of public law chair.

As a writer, he wrote for The Times and The New York Times Sunday Magazine.

Works
The Postal Power of Congress: A Study in Constitutional Expansion (1916)
America's Case Against Germany (1917)
The American Senate (1926)
Crisis Government (1934)
The Pollsters: Public Opinion, Politics and Democratic Leadership (1949)
An Introduction to the Problem of Government (1921)
The New Constitutions of Europe (1922)

References

1891 births
1970 deaths